Mykhaylo Vitaliyovych Plokhotnyuk (born 12 March 1999) is a Ukrainian professional footballer who plays as a forward for Liga II club CSM Slatina.

Career
Plokhotnyuk is a product of the  Chornomorets Odesa youth sportive school.

Inhulets Petrove
In July 2020 he signed a contract with in the Ukrainian First League Inhulets Petrove and was promoted with this team to the Ukrainian Premier League one month later. Polokhotnyuk made his debut in the Ukrainian Premier League for Inhulets on 13 September 2020, playing in a losing away match against FC Vorskla Poltava as a second half-time substituted player.

Plokhotnyuk made his first start in the Ukrainian Premier League on 14 February 2021, away at SC Dnipro-1. Unfortunately he picked up two yellow cards and was sent off; his second booking coming in the 89th minute.

On 3 April 2021, Plokhotnyuk scored his first UPL goal in a 4-3 defeat against FC Mariupol in Kharkiv.

Honours
Inhulets Petrove
Ukrainian First League: 2019–20

References

External links 
 
 

1999 births
Living people
Footballers from Odesa
Ukrainian footballers
FC Dynamo Kyiv players
FC Chornomorets Odesa players
FC Chornomorets-2 Odesa players
FC Inhulets Petrove players
FC Politehnica Iași (2010) players
CSM Slatina footballers
Ukrainian Premier League players
Ukrainian First League players
Ukrainian Second League players
Liga II players
Association football forwards
Ukraine youth international footballers
Ukrainian expatriate footballers
Expatriate footballers in Romania
Ukrainian expatriate sportspeople in Romania